Hugh McCreadie (born 2 January 1874 in Girvan) was a Scottish professional footballer, who played for Rangers. His brother Andrew McCreadie played for Rangers alongside him.

During his career McCreadie, a forward, won the Scottish league championship and the Scottish Cup, making 95 appearances in both for Rangers, scoring 32 goals.

References

1874 births
Rangers F.C. players
Scottish footballers
Association football forwards
People from Girvan
Year of death missing
Scottish Football League players
Place of death missing
Footballers from South Ayrshire